Darren Keighran (born 30 November 1969) is a former Australian rules footballer who played with Richmond in the Australian Football League (AFL).

Keighran came to Richmond from Lake Boga and appeared in the third and fourth rounds of the 1990 AFL season, losses to Hawthorn and Essendon.

References

External links
 
 

1969 births
Australian rules footballers from Victoria (Australia)
Richmond Football Club players
Living people